HD 191939 is a single yellow (G-type) main-sequence star, located approximately 174 light-years away in the constellation of Draco, taking its primary name from its Henry Draper Catalogue designation.

Characteristics 
HD 191939 is a Sun-like G-type main-sequence star, likely older than the Sun and relatively depleted in metals.

Planetary system 
In 2020, an analysis carried out by a team of astronomers led by astronomer Mariona Badenas-Agusti of the TESS project confirmed the existence of three gaseous planets, all smaller than Neptune, in orbit around HD 191939. Another non-transiting gas giant planet designated HD 191939 e was detected in 2021, along with a substellar object on a highly uncertain, 9 to 46 year orbit. In 2022, a sixth planet, with a mass comparable to Uranus, was discovered in the system's habitable zone. The 2021 study also suggested the possible presence of an additional non-transiting planet with a period of 17.7 days, but the 2022 study did not support this.

See also 
 List of extrasolar planets
List of exoplanets discovered in 2021

References 

191939
99175
1339
G-type main-sequence stars
HD, 191939
Draco (constellation)
Planetary systems with six confirmed planets
Planetary transit variables